Five Senses of Eros is a 2009 South Korean omnibus film with five short films depicting love and desire, but in different styles and genres. The shorts are: His Concern, directed by Daniel H. Byun; I'm Right Here, directed by Hur Jin-ho; The 33rd Man, directed by Yoo Young-sik; In My End Is My Beginning, directed by Min Kyu-dong; and Believe in the Moment, directed by Oh Ki-hwan.

The five directors are all graduates of the Korean Academy of Film Arts. The film received 438,501 admissions nationwide.

His Concern

Plot
A man is attracted by the woman sitting across from him on a train ride to Busan. He gets off the train after her, even though it's not his stop. He gets her phone number. A few days later the man plans to meet the woman for the second time.

Credits
Jang Hyuk as Man
Cha Hyun-jung as Woman
Director, Screenplay: Daniel H. Byun (also known as Byun Hyuk)
Cinematography: Kim Mu-yu
Editing: Hahm Sung-won
Music: Choi Man-sik
Production: Culture Cap Media
Running time: 29 min

I'm Right Here

Plot
Hye-rim waits for her husband, while hiding, to give him a surprise. Hyeon-woo always worries about his wife being left alone at home. But Hye-rim worries more about Hyeon-woo because he will be left alone soon.

Credits
Kim Kang-woo as Kang Hyeon-woo 
Cha Soo-yeon as Ahn Hye-rim
Director: Hur Jin-ho
Screenplay: Lee Jeong-hwa, Kim Gyeong-mi
Cinematography: Yun Ji-woon
Editing: Choi Jae-geun
Music: Choi Yong-rak
Production: Ho Pictures
Running time: 21 minutes

The 33rd Man

Plot
On the set of a movie, newbie actress Mi-jin and senior actress Hwa-ran are having difficulties because of their stubborn and demanding director. The charismatic Hwa-ran transforms Mi-jin into a sexy vixen to seduce Director Bong.

Credits
Kim Su-ro as Bong Jan-woon 
Bae Jong-ok as Park Hwa-ran 
Kim Min-sun as Kim Mi-jin
Director, Screenplay: Yoo Young-sik
Cinematography: Go Nak-seon
Editing: Hahm Sung-won
Music: Choi Man-sik
Production: Culture Cap Media
Running time: 25 minutes

In My End Is My Beginning

Plot
Jung-ha's husband Jae-in has just died in a car accident. She then discovers that he was having an affair with her old high school friend Na-ru. Na-ru comes to Jung-ha and asks to live with her, promising to atone through unconditional devotion.

Credits
Uhm Jung-hwa as Lee Jung-ha 
Kim Hyo-jin as Kang Na-ru 
Hwang Jung-min as Min Jae-in
Director, Screenplay: Min Kyu-dong
Cinematography: Kim Byeong-seo, Kim Jun-young
Editing: Seong Su-a
Music: Kim Jun-seong
Production: Soo Film
Running time: 28 minutes

Believe in the Moment

Plot
Three couples are all high school students and close friends. None of the couples are certain about their relationships, so they decide to exchange partners for 24 hours.

Credits
Kim Dong-wook as Han Ji-woon 
Lee Si-young as Jung Se-eun 
Jung Eui-chul as Seo Sang-min 
Shin Se-kyung as Shin Su-jeong 
Song Joong-ki as Yu Jae-hyuk 
Lee Sung-min as Lee Yun-jung
Director, Screenplay: Oh Ki-hwan
Cinematography: Kim Yeong-heung
Editing: Hahm Sung-won
Music: Choi Yong-rak
Production: 
Running time: 24 minutes

Feature-length director's cut

Min Kyu-dong later expanded his short, and a feature-length director's cut of In My End Is My Beginning was screened at the 2009 Busan International Film Festival, then received a theatrical release in 2013.

References

External links
  
 
 
 

2009 films
South Korean romance films
South Korean LGBT-related films
Lesbian-related films
South Korean erotic films
South Korean anthology films
Films directed by Hur Jin-ho
Films directed by Min Kyu-dong
2000s South Korean films
Films directed by Byun Hyuk